Hannelore Bollmann (born 10 May 1925) is a German actress. She appeared in more than thirty films, often in leading roles.

Selected filmography
 King of Hearts (1947)
 Hello, Fraulein! (1949)
 Love on Ice (1950)
 Holiday From Myself (1952)
 Carnival in White (1952)
 Marriage for One Night (1953)
 The Sweetest Fruits (1954)
 The Big Star Parade (1954)
 Roses from the South (1954)
 The Congress Dances (1955)
 Espionage (1955)
 The Happy Village (1955)
 Emperor's Ball (1956)
 All the Sins of the Earth (1958)
 Our Crazy Aunts (1961)
 Two Bavarians in Bonn (1962)

References

Bibliography

External links

1925 births
Living people
German film actresses
20th-century German actresses
Actresses from Hamburg